Decisions concerning the conduct of public worship in the Church of Scotland are entirely at the discretion of the parish minister. As a result, a wide variety of musical resources are used. However, at various times in its history, the General Assembly has commissioned volumes of psalms and hymns for use by congregations.

Scottish Psalter (1564)

The 1564 edition went through many changes that culminated with the 1635 version. Edited by Edward Millar, the 1635 Scottish Psalter included the very best of the psalm settings for the Sternhold and Hopkins psalms. This included four-part homophonic settings of many of the psalms (those texts that did not have a proper melody were assigned a melody from another psalm), several more complicated or polyphonic psalm settings (also known as Psalms in Reports), and settings of many of the so-called Common Tunes that had come to be used in the seventeenth century.

Scots Metrical Psalter (1650)
The last edition of the 1564 psalter with music was issued in 1640. However, there had been many attempts to supplant the 1564 edition, including those by none other than James VI/I. Even so, Scots clung to their beloved psalter until the Westminster assembly promised a potential union between the English and Scottish psalters. A complete psalter by Francis Rous, an English member of Parliament, was revised by the Westminster Assembly but did not satisfy the Scots. Over a period of 2 years and 4 months it was revised by direction of the General Assembly, and it has been calculated that about 40% of the lines are original to the Scottish revisors with only 10% from Rous and 30% from the Westminster Version. Accuracy of translation was in the forefront. This psalter continues in use until the present day in parts of Scotland (especially the Highlands), and around the world in some of the smaller Presbyterian denominations.

W.P. Rorison carried out a detailed comparison of the 1650 version with ten earlier psalters to trace every line. He was able to trace 4,846 lines to these 10 sources.

  
In 1929, the music of the psalter was revised by the Church of Scotland to bring its harmonies into line with those in the revision of the hymnal. The psalter was usually printed at the front of the first two editions of the hymnal (1898, 1927), and throughout much of the 20th century there was a widespread tradition of beginning worship with a psalm before continuing in the hymn books. However, the most widely used version of the third edition did not have the psalter in the same volume, with the result that the full psalter has disappeared from the majority of Church of Scotland congregations.

The psalter contained all 150 psalms in their entirety, though obviously many of them were too long to be sung whole. In 1781 a selection of 67 paraphrases of Scripture was given permissive use for a year. Although never officially adopted, the paraphrases had significant use in succeeding years, mainly in the lowlands. Five hymns were inserted at this time without church authority. Reflecting a move from the simplicity and plainness of earlier Scottish worship in some later editions there was also a set of seven trinitarian doxologies ("To Father, Son and Holy Ghost..."), each for a different metrical pattern, which could be sung at the close of a psalm. These were printed together at the end of the psalms, and were intended to allow the Old Testament text to be sung in the light of the New.

All the psalms were present in common meter (CM), which meant that in principle any psalm could be sung to any psalm tune, though not every possible combination would have been regarded as good taste. Musical editions of the psalter were published with the pages sliced horizontally, the tunes in the top half and the texts in the bottom, allowing the two parts of the volume to be opened independently. The music section was arranged alphabetically by the traditional names of the melodies. Psalm 23, "The Lord's my shepherd", would typically be sung to tune 144 "Wiltshire" (tune "Crimond", written in 1872, becoming overwhelmingly popular from the 1930s), but could theoretically be sung to almost any other, the only restriction being the conventions of familiarity. 

In addition, some psalms had alternative versions in other meters, including long meter (LM), short meter (SM), and irregular metrical patterns, and each of these had a unique tune. From the 19th century onwards, these often appeared at the end of music editions in whole rather than split pages. An example of a special setting is Psalm 24:7-10, "Ye gates lift up your heads", to the tune "St. George's Edinburgh", a rousing piece traditionally sung after Communion.

Church Hymnary (1898)

The introduction of hymns was part of a reform of worship in the second half of the 19th century which also saw the appearance of church organs and stained glass. This reform began in individual congregations such as Greyfriars Kirk, and it took several decades before the General Assembly was ready to produce a hymnal for the whole of the Church.

The Hymnary was intended to be used together with the psalter, and thus omitted such favourites as "The Lord's my shepherd". It contained 650 pieces.

Church Hymnary, revised edition (1927)

RCH contains 727 hymns and was edited by Welsh composer David Evans. Like its predecessor, it was printed together with the psalter in a single volume, and thus the hymnary itself does not include any of the metrical psalms.

A useful resource was the Handbook to the Church Hymnary by James Moffatt and Millar Patrick (published 1927, revised 1928). It gave lengthy biographical notes on the authors and composers, and commentaries on the hymns, as well as additional indexes.  Republished with a supplement in 1935

Church Hymnary, third edition (1973)

It appeared in Oxford University Press, and contained 695 items. When it first appeared, it was widely criticised for omitting many favourite hymns ("By cool Siloam's shady rill" was a prominent example), but it introduced many modern hymns like "Tell out my soul" which soon became popular - albeit to the tune "Woodlands" rather than the prescribed tune "Mappersley" which is rarely, if ever, used.

 included those metrical psalms (or sections of psalms) which were most frequently used, and thus effectively replaced the psalter in most congregations, though a version with the full psalter at the front was also printed. All the metrical psalms in the volume were expanded with a trinitarian doxology which the Psalter had printed separately; as a result, these suddenly came to be used far more frequently than ever before.

The volume is structured thematically under eight sections, each (except the last) with a number of subsections:
 Approach to God
 The Word of God: His mighty acts
 Response to the Word of God
 The sacraments
 Other ordinances
 Times and seasons
 Close of service
 Personal faith and devotion

Like RCH,  also had a handbook: John Barkley, Handbook to the Church Hymnary Third Edition, OUP 1979. Its commentaries are less full and scholarly than those of Moffatt and Patrick, but more closely tailored to the needs of worship preparation.

Songs of God's People (1988)
Songs of God's People was conceived as a supplement to CH3, and in many congregations the two were used together. For this reason, it includes no material which is also in CH3, but it does revive a number of items from RCH which had been dropped in the 1973 revision. It also included music from a variety of sources which greatly increased the range of types of music available for worship. For the first time, a Church of Scotland hymnary had: 
evangelical choruses of the Mission Praise tradition.
items of the Wild Goose Resource Group of the Iona Community worship (21 of which were composed by John L. Bell, who chaired the supplement committee).
sung responses for use in prayers, which until this time much of the Church of Scotland had regarded with suspicion as being too "Catholic"; three of these were in Latin.
short choruses in Swahili, which must be seen in the context of liberation theology and the campaign against apartheid.
three of the rock-idiom psalm arrangements by Ian White.
a Russian Orthodox Kyrie eleison.
While it is undoubtedly true that many congregations did not take advantage of the full range of this music, the volume contributed greatly to an openness to new ideas in worship.

There are 120 songs in Songs of God's People. Unlike the hymnaries, but in common with most evangelical chorus books, the volume is not arranged thematically but in alphabetical order of the first lines.

Church Hymnary, fourth edition (2005)
In 1994 the General Assembly of the Church of Scotland appointed a committee to revise the hymnary; the convener was again John L. Bell. After consultation and protracted difficulties in obtaining copyright for some hymns, Church Hymnary, fourth edition appeared in May 2005. It is published by the Canterbury Press (Norwich) and contains 825 items. In the spirit of Songs of God's People it continues the quest for diversity. For the first time a hymn book which was not specifically produced for the Gaelic community contains a hymn in Gaelic, the Christmas carol "Leanabh an àigh", for which the original text now appears in parallel to the translation "Child in a manger". Many hymns have been modified to incorporate 'inclusive language'. For example, "He gave me eyes so I could see", has been rewritten as "God gave me eyes so I could see" (Hymn 164). The feminist theology of the Motherhood of God is represented in "Mothering God" (Hymn 117). However, the temptation to reword such as "thy" to "your" has been resisted for old favourites, so, for example,  "Great is thy faithfulness" remains untouched.

In a deliberate echo of RCH,  opens with a collection of psalms arranged in the order of their original Psalm numbers (Hymns 1-108). Many of these come from the Scottish Psalter, and appear here without the doxologies added in CH3.  (These doxologies are included as Hymn 109, but their separation from the texts of the psalms presumably means they will be relatively seldom used.)  But the section also includes psalms from other musical traditions, as well as prose psalms for responsive reading - still not common in the Church of Scotland. The volume then continues, as did , with a thematic arrangement of hymns, this time divided into three main sections each associated with one person of the Holy Trinity and subdivided into aspects of God and the Church's response. There then follows an international section of short songs, including evangelical choruses by writers such as Graham Kendrick and pieces from Taizé and the Iona Community. A final short section contains Amens and Doxologies.

In some ways this is the Church of Scotland's most ambitious hymnal to date, and certainly it is the longest. The immediate reaction of the Scottish press after publication was to report complaints of pensioners who found the volume too heavy to carry to Church, but its strength no doubt lies in the breadth of musical and theological traditions which it seeks to embrace.  has a purple binding.

The hymnary is available in three editions: Full Music, Melody and Text.  There is also a large print version.
Music edition: 

This has proved popular in some liberal Anglican churches and United Reformed Churches.

The Presbyterian Church in Ireland and the United Presbyterian Church were involved in the compilation of the Church Hymnary (1898) and several Presbyterian denominations in the Revised Church Hymnary (1928) and the Church Hymnary third edition (1973).  The Presbyterian Church in Ireland declined to be involved in the fourth edition and published its own Irish Presbyterian Hymn Book in 2004.

See also
List of English-language hymnals by denomination
 Metrical psalter

16th century Protestant hymnals 

Anabaptist
 Ausbund

Anglican
Book of Common Prayer
Whole Book of Psalms

Lutheran
 First Lutheran hymnal
 Erfurt Enchiridion
 Eyn geystlich Gesangk Buchleyn
 Swenske songer eller wisor 1536
 Thomissøn's hymnal

Presbyterian
Book of Common Order

Reformed
Souterliedekens
Genevan Psalter

References
Timothy Duguid, Metrical Psalmody in Print and Practice: English 'Singing Psalms' and Scottish 'Psalm Buiks', 1547-1640 (Ashgate Press, 2014).

Miller Patrick, Five Centuries of Scottish Psalmody (Oxford University Press, 1949).

Rowland S. Ward, The Psalms in Christian Worship (Presbyterian Church of Eastern Australia, Melbourne, 1992).

External links

Scanned copy of split-leaf Scottish Psalter (1883)

Church of Scotland
Protestant hymnals
Scottish literature
Scottish music